Milesville may refer to:

Milesville, North Carolina, an unincorporated community in Caswell County
Milesville, South Dakota, an unincorporated community in Haakon County